Anton Per Erik Hagman (born 8 September 1998) is a Swedish singer. He competed in Melodifestivalen 2017 with the song "Kiss You Goodbye". On 18 February 2017, he advanced from the third semi-final to andra chansen, from which he qualified for the final where he placed tenth. Hagman also participated in Melodifestivalen 2019, with the song "Känner dig".

Discography

Extended plays

Singles

References

External links 
 

Living people
1998 births
People from Västerås
Swedish pop singers
English-language singers from Sweden
21st-century Swedish singers
21st-century Swedish male singers
Melodifestivalen contestants of 2019
Melodifestivalen contestants of 2017